Jhalak Dikhhla Jaa 4 is the fourth season of the dance reality show, Jhalak Dikhhla Jaa. It premiered on 12 December 2010 on Sony Entertainment Television. The series was hosted by Mona Singh and Sumeet Raghavan. Meiyang Chang  and Marischa Fernandes won the competition on 8 March 2011.

The Judges
 Madhuri Dixit
 Remo D'souza
 Malaika Arora Khan

Contestants 
 Meiyang Chang and Marischa Fernandez, winners on March 8, 2011
 Sushant Singh Rajput and Shampa Gopikrishna, second place on March 8, 2011
 Yana Gupta and Salman Yusuff Khan, first eliminated on January 17, 2011 then came back, third place on March 8, 2011
 Mahhi Vij and Savio Barnes, fourth place on March 8, 2011
 Ankita Lokhande and Nishant Bhat, eliminated first on January 24, 2011, came back as WC, eliminated again on February 21, 2011
 Ragini Khanna and Neerav Bavlecha, eliminated on February 14, 2011
 Shekhar Suman and Priti Gupta, eliminated on February 7, 2011
 Dayanand Shetty and Vrushali Chavan, eliminated on January 31, 2011
 Krushna Abhishek and Robin, eliminated on January 10, 2011
 Akhil Kumar and Sneha Kapoor, eliminated on January 3, 2011
 Renuka Shahane and Jai Kumar Nair, eliminated on December 27, 2010
 Anushka Manchanda and Punit Pathak, eliminated on December 20, 2010

Guest appearances
 Arti Singh
 Govinda
 Hema Malini
 Helen
 Mika Singh
 Anushka Sharma
 Ranveer Singh
 Kinshuk Mahajan
 Parul Chauhan
 Mohnish Bahl
 Lata Sabharwal
 Adhyayan Suman
 Esha Deol
 Dharmendra
 Kavita Kaushik
 Hina Khan
 Manasi Parekh

Scoring Chart

green  numbers indicates the highest score.
red numbers indicates the lowest score.
 indicates the winning couple.
 indicates the runner-up couple.
 indicates the second runner-up couple
 indicates the fourth-place couple
 indicates the couple eliminated that week.
 indicates the returning couple that finished in the bottom three.
n/a indicates the couple did not get any scores

Notes
 In week 5, Yana was in the bottom two with Ragini and Ankita but after she got voted out while Ragini got saved. After in week 7, she came back as a wild card and got selected.
 In week 6, Ankita (who is well known for her role in Pavitra Rishta was in the bottom two with Ragini and Ankita but after she got voted out while Ragini got saved. After in week 7, she came back as a wild card and got selected. In week 10, Ankita left the show.

Weekly Summary
Week 1: contestants performed on styles like Jazz, Samba and Jive. The top scorers were Shekhar and Priti who scored  and the lowest were Akhil and Sneha, Anushka and Puneet and Chang and Marischa who scored 
Week 2: The contestants performed this time on dance styles like Cha-Cha, Tango and Salsa. Sushant and Shampa received the first  for their stunning salsa. The lowest scorers were Renuka and Jai scoring . Anushka Manchanda was eliminated and hence could not perform.
Week 3: The contestants were asked to perform on Indian folk styles. The top scorers were Sushant and Shampa, Yana and Salman and Ragini and Neerav who received  and the lowest scorers were Akhil and Sneha, and Mahi and Savio who scored . Renuka and Jai were eliminated and hence could not perform.
Week 4: The contestants were asked to perform with another celebrity that is in a trio. The guest participants were Rashami Desai, Aishwarya Sakhuja, Jai Soni, Vidya Malvade, Vikrant Massey, Saloni Daini, Sarita Joshi and Neha Marda. Akhil and Sneha were eliminated and hence could not perform.
Teen Ka Tadka
Ragini & Neerav - Jay Soni
Ankita & Nishant - Nandish Sandhu
Sushant & Shampa - Rashami Desai
Yana & Salman - Aishwarya Sakhuja
Krushna & Robin - Sarita Joshi
Dayanand & Vrushali - Saloni Daini
Mahhi & Savio - Vikrant Massey
Akhil & Sneha - Ishita Panchal
Shekhar & Priti - Vidya Malvade
Chang & Marischa - Neha Marda
Week 5: The contestants were asked to perform on street dance styles like Locking and Popping, Crumping, Hip-Hop, Lyrical Hip-Hop, Stomping etc. After 4 performances each the contestants were asked to perform a group dance which would give them a chance to increase their scores making the total out of 40. The first day group dance style was Disco whereas for the second day it was Jive. Model Yana Gupta's partner Salman suffered from an injury in the leg and therefore their style was changed from Crumping to Hip-Hop. Krushna and Robin were eliminated and hence did not perform.
Week 6: The Contestants were asked to give a tribute to Madhuri Dixit by performing Bollywood style on her songs. Many actors and Directors shared their thoughts with Madhuri. This week too, the contestants had to perform a group dance after all the performances of the day were over but this the total was out of 30 instead of 10 making their total out of 60. The lowest scorers were Daya and Vrushali who scored a 
Week 7: The eliminated contestants had their last chance to come back in the contest and be the wild card entry. All the 6 contestants had performed and were given a rank out of six instead of a score. Akhil and Sneha ranked 6th, Renuka and Jai ranked 5th, Anushka and Puneet ranked 4th, Krushna and Robin ranked 3rd, Ankita and Nishant raked 2nd, Yana and Salman ranked 1st. The judges were only supposed to select one wild card entry but however the judges decided to put the top 2 ranked teams as wild card entries. As a result, Yana and Salman, Ankita and Nishant were selected to come in the next round.
Week 8: This week the contestants performed on the challenge given by Malika Arora Khan. Ragini and Neerav  and Daya and Vrushali were in the bottom 2 and had to perform in a dance-off. All the three judges voted for Ragini and thus, Daya and Vrushali were eliminated.
Week 9:The Contestants this time had to do 2 performances instead of one. Ankita and Shekhar had to participate in the dance off. Madhuri and Remo voted for Ankita and Malaika voted for Shekhar. Shekhar and his partner Preeti were eliminated.
Week 10:This time too, the contestants had to do 2 performances. This time in the bottom 2 were Yana and Ragini. All three judges voted for Yana. As a result, Ragini and Neerav were eliminated.
Week 11:Again the contestants had to do 2 performances. Sushant Singh Rajput and his partner Shampa did not perform as Sushant suffered from back injury. In the bottom two were Yana and Ankita. All three judges voted for Yana and hence Ankita was eliminated
Week 12: This week the bottom two were Sushant and Shampa  and Yana and Salman. However, the judges felt that none of them should be eliminated and used their special power to keep both the contestants in.
Week 13: Mahi and Savio were eliminated and therefore the top three were Sushant and Shampa, Yana and Salman and Chang and Marischa. On the Tuesday night finale the results were announced as Shushant and shampa as the winner each winning Twenty-Five Lakh Rupees. Chang and Yana were the runners-up. Sushant and Shampa won the Ujala Consistent Performer Award of Five Lakh Rupees.

References

External links

 Jhalak Dikhhla Jaa Official website

Jhalak Dikhhla Jaa seasons
Sony Entertainment Television original programming
2010 Indian television seasons
2011 Indian television seasons

pl:Jhalak Dikhhla Jaa